Jo Su-sie (born 9 September 1994) is a South Korean ice hockey player. She competed in the 2018 Winter Olympics.

References

1994 births
Living people
Ice hockey players at the 2018 Winter Olympics
South Korean women's ice hockey forwards
Olympic ice hockey players of South Korea
Winter Olympics competitors for Korea
Ice hockey players at the 2017 Asian Winter Games
21st-century South Korean women